Trinity Christian High School may refer to:
Trinity Christian High School (Hull, Iowa)
Trinity Christian High School (Lubbock, Texas)
Trinity Christian High School (Monterey)

See also
Trinity Christian School (disambiguation)
Trinity College (disambiguation)
Trinity High School (disambiguation)
Trinity School (disambiguation)